This is a timeline documenting events of Jazz in the year 2009.

Events

January
 9 – The 5th Ice Music Festival started in Geilo, Norway (January 9 – 11).

February
 4 – The 12th Polarjazz Festival started in Longyearbyen, Svalbard (February 4–8).

March
 6 – The 5th Jakarta International Java Jazz Festival started in Jakarta, Indonesia (March 6–8).
 18
 The 36th Vossajazz started at Voss, Norway (March 18–20).
 Kjetil Møster was awarded Vossajazzprisen 2009.
 19 – Solveig Slettahjell performs the commissioned work Tarpan Seasons for Vossajazz 2009.

April
 22 – The 15th SoddJazz started in Inderøy, Norway (April 22–26).

May
 20 – The 37th Nattjazz started in Bergen, Norway (May 26–30).
 29 – The 38th Moers Festival started in Moers, Germany (May 29 – June 1).

June
 29 – The 21st Jazz Fest Wien started in Vienna, Austria (June 29 – July 9).
 30 – The 29th Montreal International Jazz Festival started in Montreal, Quebec, Canada (June 30 - July 12).

July
 1 – The 45th Kongsberg Jazzfestival started in Kongsberg, Norway (July 1 – 4).
 3
 The 31st Copenhagen Jazz Festival started in Copenhagen, Denmark (July 3 – 12).
 The 43rd Montreux Jazz Festival started in Montreux, Switzerland (July 3 – 18).
 10
 The 34th North Sea Jazz Festival started in The Hague, Netherlands (July 10 – 12).
 The 44th Pori Jazz Festival started in Pori, Finland (July 10 – 19).
 13 – The 49th Moldejazz started in Molde, Norway (July 13 – 18).
 15 – The 26th Stockholm Jazz Festival started in Stockholm, Sweden (July 15 – 18).
 18
 The 44th San Sebastian Jazz Festival started in San Sebastian, Spain (July 18 – 20).
 The 62nd Nice Jazz Festival started in Nice, France (July 18 – 25).

August
 7 – The 25th Brecon Jazz Festival started in Brecon, Wales (August 7 – 9).
 8 – The 53rd Newport Jazz Festival started in Newport, Rhode Island (August 8 – 10).
 9 – The 24th Oslo Jazzfestival started in Oslo, Norway (August 9 – 15).
 12 – The 23rd Sildajazz starts in Haugesund, Norway (August 12 – 16).

September
 2 – The 5th Punktfestivalen started in Kristiansand, Norway (September 2 – 5).
 19 – The 52nd Monterey Jazz Festival started in Monterey, California (September 19 – 21).

October

November
 13 – The 18th London Jazz Festival started in England (November 13 – 22).

December

Album released

January

February

March

April

May

June

July

August

September

October

November

December

Deaths

 January
 17 – Whitey Mitchell, American jazz bassist and television writer/producer (born 1932).
 20 – David "Fathead" Newman, American saxophonist (born 1933).
 24 – Leonard Gaskin, American bassist (born 1920).
 29 – Hank Crawford, American alto saxophonist, arranger, and songwriter (born 1934).

 February
 7 – Blossom Dearie, American jazz singer and pianist (born 1924).
 9
 Vic Lewis, British guitarist (born 1919).
 Orlando "Cachaito" López, Cuban bassist and composer (born 1933).
 12
 Coleman Mellett, American jazz guitarist (plane crash) (born 1974).
 Gerry Niewood, American jazz saxophonist (plane crash) (born 1943).
 Mat Mathews, Dutch jazz accordionist (born 1924).
 14 – Louie Bellson, American jazz drummer (born 1924).
 15 – Joe Cuba, Puerto Rican jazz percussionist (born 1931).
 18 – Snooks Eaglin, American guitarist and singer (born 1936).
 19 – Harrison Ridley Jr., American jazz presenter (born 1938).
 20 – Fats Sadi, Belgian jazz musician, vocalist and composer (born 1927).
 25
 Ian Carr, Scottish trumpeter, composer, writer, and educator (born 1933).
 Lyman Woodard, American organist (born 1942).
 27 – William L. Fowler, American jazz guitarist and educater (born 1917).
 28 – Arthur Jenkins, American keyboardist, composer, arranger, and percussionist (born 1936).

 March
 11 – Lars Erstrand, Swedish vibraphonist (born 1936).
 18
 Eddie Bo, American singer and pianist (born 1930).
 Moultrie Patten, American pianist and actor (born 1919).
 25 – Tito Alberti, Argentine drummer (born 1923).

 April
 2 – Bud Shank, American alto saxophonist and flautist (born 1926).
 3 – Charlie Kennedy, American alto saxophonist (born 1927).
 7 – Gugge Hedrenius, Swedish pianist and bandleader (born 1938).
 8 – Herbie Lovelle, American drummer (born 1924).
 12 – Zeke Zarchy, American trumpeter (born 1915).
 16 – Viktor Paskov, Bulgarian writer, singer, musicologist, and screenwriter (born 1949).
 29 – Tom McGrath, Scottish playwright and pianist (born 1940).

 May
 14 – Buddy Montgomery, American jazz vibraphonist and pianist (born 1930).
 15 – Wayman Tisdale, American basketball player and bass guitarist (born 1964).
 21 – Uli Trepte, German upright bassist (born 1941).

 June
 3
 Koko Taylor, American singer (born 1928).
 Sam Butera, American tenor saxophonist (born 1927).
 7
 Hugh Hopper, British bass guitarist (born 1945).
 Kenny Rankin, American singer and songwriter (born 1940).
 10 – Jack Nimitz, American baritone saxophonist (born 1930).
 11 – Jarmo Savolainen, Finnish pianist and composer (born 1961).
 16
 Charlie Mariano, American saxophonist (born 1923).
 Tina Marsh, American jazz singer and composer (cancer) (born 1954).
 22 – Eddie Preston, American jazz trumpeter (born 1925).
 23 – Raymond Berthiaume, Canadian singer, producer, and composer (born 1931).

 July
 4 – Jim Chapin, American drummer (born 1919).
 22 – Sonny Dallas, American bassist and singer (born 1931).
 27 – George Russell, American jazz pianist, composer, arranger, and theorist (born 1923).

 August
 11 – Kitty White, American singer (born 1923).
 12 – Rashied Ali, American drummer (born 1933).
 13 – Les Paul, American jazz guitarist and inventor of solid-body electric guitar, and multi-track recording (born 1915).
 24 – Joe Maneri, American composer, saxophonist, and clarinetist (born 1927).
 29 – Chris Connor, American jazz singer (born 1927).
 31 – Eddie Higgins, American pianist, composer, and orchestrator (born 1932).

 September
 7 – Eddie Locke, American jazz drummer (born 1930).
 8 – Luther Thomas, American alto saxophonist and multi-instrumentalist (born 1950).
 14 – Bobby Graham, English session drummer, composer, arranger, and record producer (born 1940).
 15 – Nunzio Rotondo, Italian trumpeter and bandleader (born 1924).

 October
 8 – Abu Talib, African-American guitarist (born 1939).
 10 – Sonny Bradshaw, Jamaican bandleader, trumpeter, broadcaster, and promoter (born 1926).
 13
 Al Martino, American singer and actor (born 1927).
 Winston Mankunku Ngozi, South African tenor saxophonist (born 1943).
 14 – Jerry van Rooyen, Dutch trumpeter, conductor, and composer (born 1928).
 21 – Sirone, American bassist and composer (born 1940).

 November
 6 – Kjell Bartholdsen, Norwegian saxophonist (stroke) (born 1938).
 10 – Dick Katz, American pianist, arranger, and record producer (born 1924).
 16 – Jeff Clyne, British bassist (born 1937).
 20 – Billy James, American drummer (born 1936).
 21 – Gerhard Aspheim, Norwegian trombonist (born 1930).
 22 – Haydain Neale, Canadian singer-songwriter (born 1970).
 24 – Hale Smith, American composer, pianist, educator, arranger, and editor (born 1925).
 26 – Pia Beck, Dutch pianist and singer (born 1925).

 December
 8 – Su Cruickshank, Australian singer, actress, and writer (born 1946).
 16 – Terry Pollard, American pianist and vibraphonist (born 1931).
 20 – Pete King, British tenor saxophonist(born 1929).
 25 – Rusty Dedrick, American trumpeter and composer (born 1918).

 Unknown date
 Pocho Lapouble, Argentine drummer, composer and arranger (born 1942).

See also

 List of 2009 albums
 List of years in jazz
 2000s in jazz
 2009 in music

References

External links 
 History Of Jazz Timeline: 2009 at All About Jazz

2000s in jazz
Jazz